In Hong Kong, the suicide rate of primary, secondary, and post-secondary students is relatively high, particularly beginning in the 2014–2015 academic year. The suicide cases are not connected, but the frequency of suicides aroused public's attention to the mental health and academic pressure of Hong Kong students.

General background

Statistics 
Since the commencement of the 2015 school year, a large number of students have committed suicide. Over 70 suicide cases were reported from 2015 to 2017. The alarming frequency of youth suicide is very worrying as the numbers continue to rise. This has raised concerns that students in Hong Kong face too much academic stress. Based on records from the Coroner's Court, there were 70 suicide incidents of individuals aged 15–24 in 2015 and 23 of them were full-time students.

Various media reports state that suicide can be contagious and can intensify copycat effect. This illustrates that more deaths could occur. The distribution of deaths is shown below:

It is worth to note that the current data on primary and secondary suicide cases also reveal a significant association between gender and mental illness. In Hong Kong, male suicide rates outnumber female deaths. The Final Report published by the Committee on Prevention of Student Suicides (Chinese: 防止學生自殺委員會) suggested the reason may be an unwillingness amongst men to talk openly with health care professionals and treat mental disorders. This is contrary to females who  are more likely to seek help.

List of suicide cases 

Below are lists of reported student suicides

2014–2015 academic year

2015–2016 academic year

2016–2017 academic year

2017–2018 academic year

2018–2019 academic year

2020–2021 academic year

Causes of suicide
There can be many reasons for suicide. A number of reasons can intertwined with each other and lead an individual to take their own life.

Education in Hong Kong

In Hong Kong, "academic results determines the future" is a very common notion.  Teachers, parents and students focus on attaining good academic results. This puts great pressure on students to pursue academic excellence. The Hong Kong Diploma of Secondary Education (HKDSE) is seen as a "one-off exam". In a poll conducted by the "New Youth World", students rated their level of pressure as 7.44 out of 10 under HKDSE. The life planning support is insufficient in Hong Kong. Students see hard work as their only way out. The pressure is so much so that students neglect their own capabilities and interests. Therefore, students easily feel stressed when they are not performing well academically.

Copycat suicides

Suicide cluster is an emulation of another suicide that the person attempting suicide knows about, either from local knowledge or due to accounts or depictions of the original suicide on Television and in other media. Imitative suicide is common in the under 25 age group. In Hong Kong, it has been suggested that due to the widespread news report of youth suicide, students are driven to copy such suicides.

Psychological concerns
In 2015–2016, 24 out of 38 suicide cases involved psychological factors. showed that 13 victims displayed, suicidal ideation and 17 victims showed feelings of hopelessness. However, vital psychological support from schools, teachers, social workers and parents was not enough at that time. Unfortunately, this has not changed; many students still feel alone and helpless and see suicide as their only way out.

Existing support

The help and resources available for students is divided into three categories: universal help (for students in general), selective help (for vulnerable students) and indicated help (for students who are at risk of committing suicide).

Universal help consists of information, workshops and other tools to help and improve mental health and prevent suicide. This helps raise awareness of the topics of mental health and suicide. It is also possible for schools to apply for up to HKD$150,000 from the Quality Education Fund to finance activities related to the well-being of students.

Selective help is aimed at students with a heightened risk of suicide. An example of selective help can be screening tools to find at-risk cases in time. For example, The Centre for Suicide Research provide interactive advise on their web page. This advise is aimed towards teachers, parents and friends who are worried that someone close to them may be at risk of suicide.

Indicated help is aimed at students who are at a high risk of committing suicide. Post-secondary institutions are advised to have a 24 hours hotline and easy access to psychiatric and psychological services. Schools do not always live up to this standard. There are multiple independent hotlines, as well as hotlines run by the Social Welfare Department. Examples of suicide hotlines are the Suicide prevention Services, The Samaritan Befrienders Hong Kong, and Youth Outreach.

Response from the Education Bureau

Attitude of the Bureau 
In a legislative council meeting on 16 March 2016, former legislative council member Wong Yuk-man raised the point that one of the possible causes of students suicide could be the Hong Kong's education system. This system infamously puts too much emphasis on competition. He suggested that parents and teachers barely have time to help students cope with emotional distress as there is more focus on academic results of students. He questioned the Education Bureau regarding whether it will identify the causes in the current education system that lead to enormous pressure on students.

In response to the question, former Secretary for Education Eddie Ng replied that suicide is a complex matter that has no single cause. In fact, he noted, students’ academic pressure has been reduced under the implementation of New Academic Structure (NAS) in 2009. For example, students under the NAS only have to sit for one public examination, and are able to choose elective subjects in accordance with their interests and abilities to develop their potential.

He further raised the point that suicides could be prevented with better life planning.

On 13 November 2016, the Education Bureau raised a similar viewpoint. It was restated that evidence based research indicated that the cause of suicide is complicated. Reasons behind each case rarely are the same. It cannot be proved that the education system or a particular academic environment could directly lead to suicide.

Policies and committees

Healthy School Policy 
In February 2010, the Education Bureau circled a memorandum encouraging the implementation of the Healthy School Policy in primary and secondary schools. Each school was encouraged to formulate their own implementation plan. This policy was first implemented in the school year of 2010–2011. The aim of the policy is divided into four different elements: developing a management and organisation system for health matters; encouraging a healthy school environment; promoting a healthy lifestyle for students and recognising of students in need; and creating a system for handling high risk students. The policy is foremost an anti substance abuse effort. It also touches upon issues related to students’ mental health and student suicide.

Prevention of Student Suicide Committee 
On 30 March 2016, the Educational Bureau set up the Prevention of Student Suicide Committee  in response to the spate of students' suicides in the 2015–16 school year. The committee was tasked with studying student suicides in Hong Kong and thereby offering any preemptive solutions to the problem of youth suicide. The committee consists of 21 members consisting of teachers, parents, psychiatrists and the president of the student union at the University of Hong Kong. Professor  is the director of the Centre for Suicide Research and Prevention  in addition to being a chairperson in the Prevention of Student Suicide Committee.

In November 2016, the Prevention of Student Suicide Committee released their final report which presents the current understanding of the student suicide problem and possible solutions. The measures suggested in the report are, including but not limited to, enhancement of the support for families, student support in schools, and promoting the acceptance of alternative career paths. In relation to the Report, the Education Bureau has formulated several practical and follow-up actions to build a multi-layered safety net for students according to four areas. This includes promotion of students’ mental well-being and health, stregtehing the support from teachers and schools, reviewing relevant domains in the education system, and inclusion of family life and parent education.

In addition to this, the Education Bureau proceeded with different policies and projects in response to the 2015–2016 student suicides and the following public discontent. Some examples are as follows: providing education material to schools so that they can identify students with difficulties and providing education to students on coping strategies and positive attitudes. In this case, the educational material for schools, parents and students consisted of pamphlets on the topic of "Enhancing Life Resilience". A memo was sent out on 24 June 2016 to inform the heads of different schools of this material.

Committee on Home-School Co-operation 
The Committee on Home-School Co-operation (abbr.: CHSC), was set up after a recommendation from Education Commission. It was created to encourage cooperation between parents and teachers. Chiefly by encouraging the set-up of Parent-Teacher Association and by organising activities made to improve home-school cooperation. A memorandum was sent out on 10 June 2016 from the Secretary for Education to inform all supervisors and heads of schools. To achieve these goals the Committee on Home-School Co-operation set up three different types of grants that schools could apply for. The first category of grant, with a maximum sum of around HKD$5000, is for schools seeking to set up a Parent-Teacher Association. The second type of grant, with a maximum sum of HKD$5000, is for schools seeking to organise an activity with the purpose of encouraging home-school cooperation. Activities can, for example, be aimed at parenting training, assisting parents to support their children, or student mental health. The third type of grant is for joint Home-School Co-operation Projects.

Other initiatives

No-suicide contracts 

No-suicide contracts for students, have been a long debated in topic in Hong Kong. Nevertheless, they are used by mental health care professionals as a way to prevent suicides. The contract is an agreement that states the student will not commit suicide or harm themselves in any way. Furthermore, the contract lists hotlines, contacts, and an emergency number that the student should call in case of suicidal thoughts. However, the No-Suicide contract is not a legal document. In March 2016 a copy of the Educational Bureaus No-Suicide Contract for students was circulated on the internet.

Detecting youths at risk online 
The Prevention of Student Suicide Committee has, since 2017, been in talks with Facebook and Google about the possibility of using these platforms as a tool for detecting student at risk of committing suicide. Facebook and Google already have their own suicide detection and prevention systems.

Criticism
Hong Kong Professional Teachers' Union
The HKPTU criticised that the final report lacked recurrent input of resources, manpower, and concrete suggestions.
The Civil Alliance for Student Suicide (Chinese: 防止學生自殺民間聯席)
The Alliance criticised that the Committee of Prevention of Student Suicide was shirking its responsibility and blaming the victims by stating that there is no substantial link between suicide incidents and the education system in the Final Report.
Ip Kin-yuen (Legislative Councillor for Education constituency)
Ip felt disappointed by the Final report. It was pointed out there is no direct relationship between the education system and youth suicide. The Education Bureau is therefore, evading its responsibility and has missed the chance to review the education system. He further criticised the current education system by stating that it puts students under unnecessary pressure. He also mentioned that the Report failed to address the root problem and he therefore request more resources from the government.
Shiu Ka-chun (Social Worker, Legislative Councillor for Social Welfare Constituency, associate director of the Center for Youth Research and Practice (Chinese: 青年研究實踐中心) at Hong Kong Baptist University)
Shiu suggested that youth suicide has many causes. This includes the education system, economy, societal culture and structure, to name a few. He criticised the government for ignoring the suggestion of organising a summit to address the problem and to make concrete anti-suicide policies.
Althea Suen Hiu-nam (Chinese: 孫曉嵐) (Former president of the Hong Kong University Students' Union, a social work student, member of the Prevention of Student Suicide Committee)
Suen is the only youth member in the Prevention of Student Suicide Committee. She suggested that Hong Kong's exam-oriented education placed undue pressure on both teachers and students. This leads to reduced time for teachers to notice, let alone take care of students’ mental well-being during the meetings. Her views were, however, absent in the Final report, stating that there is no substantial direct link between student suicides and the education system. She questioned whether the government is genuine in including young voices and participation on advisory bodies, and accused the pro-establishment forces of the committee for disregarding her views.

Suggestions
In the final report, the Prevention of Student Suicide Committee divided their recommendations into universal, selective and indicated support. Furthermore, the 19 suggestions are divided into areas of improvement, as follows: student support, families, traditional and social media, multiple articulation pathways, and systematic. The 19 suggestions are:

In November 2016, the Hong Kong Professional Teachers' Union made the following suggestions: (1) Alleviation of teachers’ pressure e.g. increasing the quota of regular teachers and increase the teacher-student ratio per class; (2) Enhancing support from social workers (e.g. ensuring there is at least one social worker and one counsellor in each school); (3) Enhancing school-based educational psychology service (Chinese: 校本教育心理服務); (4) Reform of education system, e.g. abolish Territory-wide System Assessment.

In 2017, the Civil Alliance for Student Suicide Prevention publicised a survey that indicated public support for capping the number of hours spent studying each day to 7 hours. Lai Pak-yin, the spokesperson from the Civil Alliance for Student Suicide Prevention, argues that excessive studying can have a harmful effect on family relationships. Therefore, he suggested that the Educational Bureau should issue guidelines to help decrease the number of hours spent studying each day.

Controversy

Prevention of Student Suicides Page 

In April 2017, the Education Bureau set up the "Prevention of Student Suicides" page. They uploaded different resources and tips on how to identify and manage students with suicidal tendencies. The Bureau's website had a document titled "The Package on Prevention of Student Suicide (2010)". It was in Chinese. One of the examples suggested in the document was a way to communicate with friends who have suicidal tendencies. This example attracted huge public backlash – "If you die, your boyfriend may be sad for a few days, but he will soon find a new girlfriend and live normally. It is not worth doing such a silly thing for him!".

Various educators and social workers commented that the controversial example can be very dangerous for people with suicidal thoughts. According to Shiu Ka-chun, the example provided was dismissive and could encourage pessimistic ideas further adding to the suicidal thoughts.

Suicide of Choi Yuk-lin's son  

On 7 September 2017, the Under-secretary for Education Christine Choi Yuk-lin's 25-year-old son, Poon Hong-yan, jumped to his death from the family's flat on the 41st floor at Sorrento. It was revealed that he suffered from depression due to serious injuries from a triathlon accident. Various officials, such as the Chief Executive Carrie Lam and Secretary for Education Kevin Yeung, expressed their condolences to Choi and her family.

As Choi Yuk-lin is a member of the Prevention of Student Suicide Committee, some critics linked the incident with student suicide problem. Choi was attacked and criticized for failing to consider her adolescent sons concerns and perspectives. Suen Hiu-nam, head of HKU's student union, further criticized officials for only sending their condolences to Choi's son, and ignoring other students who had committed suicide.

On the same day, signs bearing the slogan "Congratulations Choi Yuk-lin's son on going west" appeared on the Education University of Hong Kong Democracy Wall, on top of banners supporting freedom of expression and Hong Kong independence. The university later issued a statement condemning the signs and apologising for any hurt those signs may have caused.

References 

Suicides in Hong Kong
Youth in Hong Kong
2010s in Hong Kong